Djibril Tamsir Paye (born 26 February 1990) is a Guinean professional footballer who plays as a defender for Championnat National 2 club Romorantin. He played three matches for the Guinea national team from 2014 to 2015.

Club career
In September 2008, Paye signed for Sheriff Tiraspol of Moldova.

In July 2014, Paye moved to Belgium side Zulte Waregem.

Honours
Sheriff Tiraspol
Moldovan National Division:  2013–14
Moldovan Cup:  2008-09
Moldovan Super Cup:  2013
CIS Cup:  2009
FC Tiraspol
Moldovan Cup:  2012–13

References

External links 
 Moldova Sports Stats
 Sheriff Tiraspol Profile
 
 

1990 births
Living people
Guinean footballers
Guinea international footballers
Association football defenders
FC Sheriff Tiraspol players
S.V. Zulte Waregem players
Saint-Pryvé Saint-Hilaire FC players
SO Romorantin players
Moldovan Super Liga players
Belgian Pro League players
Championnat National 3 players
Championnat National 2 players
Guinean expatriate footballers
Expatriate footballers in Moldova
Expatriate footballers in Belgium
Expatriate footballers in France
Guinean expatriate sportspeople in Moldova
Guinean expatriate sportspeople in Belgium
Guinean expatriate sportspeople in France
2015 Africa Cup of Nations players